Caironi is an Italian surname. Notable people with the surname include:

Jakob Caironi (1902–?), Swiss cyclist
Martina Caironi (born 1989), Italian athlete

Italian-language surnames